is the third single by Shouta Aoi, released on December 3, 2014. "Himitsu no Kuchizuke" served as the ending theme song to the show Break Out for the month of December 2014, while the B-side, "Glitter Wish", was the theme song to the OVA This Boys Suffers From Crystallization.

Background and release

"Himitsu no Kuchizuke" is Shouta Aoi's third single released under his current stage name. The song was used as the ending theme song to the show Break Out for the month of December 2014, while the B-side, "Glitter Wish", was the theme song to the OVA This Boy Suffers From Crystallization, which Aoi also starred in as Ayumu Tamari.

The single was released on December 3, 2014 under the B-green label, along with the B-side "Glitter Wish." Along with the regular edition, a limited edition version of the single was released with an alternate covers and a DVD exclusive featuring the music video for "Himitsu no Kuchizuke."

Reception
"Himitsu no Kuchizuke" reached #11 on the Oricon Weekly Singles Chart and charted for 4 weeks. The song also debuted at #20 on the Billboard Japan Hot 100.

Track listing

Charts

Notes

References

2014 singles
2014 songs
Anime songs
Japanese-language songs
Television drama theme songs